The 1920 Boston Braves season was the 50th season of the franchise.

Regular season 
On May 1, the Braves and the Brooklyn Robins (later the Brooklyn Dodgers and now the Los Angeles Dodgers) played what remains the longest major league baseball game, tied 1 to 1 at the end of nine innings and then going scoreless for 17 more until the game 26-inning game was called because of darkness

Season standings

Record vs. opponents

Notable transaction 
 August 21, 1920: Frank Gibson was purchased by the Braves from the San Antonio Bears.

Roster

Player stats

Batting

Starters by position 
Note: Pos = Position; G = Games played; AB = At bats; H = Hits; Avg. = Batting average; HR = Home runs; RBI = Runs batted in

Other batters 
Note: G = Games played; AB = At bats; H = Hits; Avg. = Batting average; HR = Home runs; RBI = Runs batted in

Pitching

Starting pitchers 
Note: G = Games pitched; IP = Innings pitched; W = Wins; L = Losses; ERA = Earned run average; SO = Strikeouts

Other pitchers 
Note: G = Games pitched; IP = Innings pitched; W = Wins; L = Losses; ERA = Earned run average; SO = Strikeouts

References

External links
1920 Boston Braves season at Baseball Reference

Boston Braves seasons
Boston Braves
Boston Braves
1920s in Boston